Jean-Olivier Chénier (December 9, 1806 – December 14, 1837) was a physician in Lower Canada (present-day Quebec). Born in Lachine (or maybe Montreal). During the Lower Canada Rebellion, he commanded the Patriote forces in the Battle of Saint-Eustache. Trapped with his men in a church by the government troops who set flames to the building, he was killed while attempting to escape through a window. He died to shouts of "Remember Weir!", a reference to George Weir, a government spy executed by the Patriotes. The government forces mutilated Chénier's corpse to intimidate the remaining Patriote supporters: 

Chénier was excommunicated from the Roman Catholic religion until 1945.   The name was condemned because Jean-Olivier Chénier fought on holy ground inside a church.  The Chénier park in the Bas-St-Laurent was renamed after the excommunication of the family. The excommunicated family moved to Hawkesbury, Ontario.

There is a statue of Jean-Olivier Chénier in St-Eustache in remembrance of those who died in the fire of 1837. Another used to be situated on St. Denis Street in downtown Montréal. However, this statue was removed at about the same time when the new Université de Montréal Health Centre was inaugurated, in 2016, in 2021.

Chénier Street in Montreal is named for him, as is the Jean-Olivier-Chénier Section of the Saint-Jean-Baptiste Society of Montreal. The Chénier Cell of the Front de libération du Québec (FLQ), held responsible for the killing of Pierre Laporte, was also named for him.

CLSC Jean Olivier Chénier on Oka Road in Saint-Eustache, Quebec, was also named after Chénier.

A daycare centre situated in Saint-Eustache is named "Les petits Patriotes" ("The Little Patriots").

See also
Patriote movement
Quebec nationalism
Quebec independence movement
History of Quebec
Timeline of Quebec history

References

External links
Biography at the Dictionary of Canadian Biography Online

1806 births
1838 deaths
People excommunicated by the Catholic Church
Lower Canada Rebellion people
Pre-Confederation Quebec people
Quebec revolutionaries
People from Lachine, Quebec